E38 or E-38 may refer to:
 BMW E38, a BMW 7 Series automobile
 HMS E38, a 1916 British E class submarine
 Hikarigaoka Station or E-38, a Tokyo Toei Ōedo Line railway station
 Nimzo-Indian Defence or E38, a chess opening
 Alpine–Casparis Municipal Airport, an airport in Texas having the FAA LID code of E38.
 European route E38 in Ukraine, Russia and Kazakhstan
 Dōtō Expressway (main route) and Kushiro Sotokan Road (between Kushiro-nishi IC and Kushiro-higashi IC), route E38 in Japan
 SMART Tunnel, route E38 in Malaysia